Nicholas Collon (born 7 February 1983 in London) is a British conductor.

Biography
A viola player, organist and pianist by training, Collon played viola in the National Youth Orchestra of Great Britain (NYOGB). He studied at Eton and was an organ scholar at Clare College, Cambridge. One of his conducting mentors was Sir Colin Davis, and Collon has served as an assistant conductor to Sir Mark Elder.

In 2004, Collon, Robin Ticciati and fellow NYOGB musicians founded the Aurora Orchestra, with Collon as its artistic director. He was awarded the 2008 Arts Foundation Fellowship for conducting, from a list of twenty nominated British conductors. For the 2011–2012 season, Collon was Assistant Conductor of the London Philharmonic Orchestra.

In April 2007, Collon conducted Mozart's The Magic Flute, directed by Samuel West, in Ramallah and Bethlehem, the first-ever staged opera production in the West Bank, and returned in 2009 with the same team for performances of La bohème.  His English National Opera conducting debut was in September 2012. In June 2013, he conducted the British stage premiere of Jonathan Harvey's opera Wagner Dream for Welsh National Opera.

In June 2015, the Residentie Orchestra in The Hague announced the appointment of Collon as its co-principal conductor, effective 1 August 2016, for a minimum term of three years, with an estimate of 6 weeks of appearances per season. In June 2017, the Residentie Orchestra announced Collon's appointment as the Residentie Orchestra's sole chief conductor and artistic advisor, effective 1 August 2018, with a minimum of 8 weeks of appearances per season. He stood down as chief conductor of the Residentie Orchestra at the close of the 2020–2021 season.

In 2017, Collon first guest-conducted the Finnish Radio Symphony Orchestra (FRSO).  In May 2019, the FRSO announced the appointment of Collon as its next chief conductor, effective with the 2021–2022 season.  He is the first non-Finnish conductor to be named chief conductor of the FRSO.  In February 2023, the FRSO announced the extension of Collon's contract as its chief conductor through the 2027-2028 season.

Collon has conducted commercial recordings with the Aurora Orchestra for Warner Classics.

Collon is married to flutist Jane Mitchell, creative leader of the Aurora Orchestra.

References

External links
 Official website of Nicholas Collon
 Aurora Orchestra website page on Collon
 International Classical Artists agency page on Collon
 Arts Foundation, "Nicholas Collon: Conducting – Winner 2008"
 Mike Reynolds, 'Interview: Nicholas Collon'.  MusicalCriticism.com webpage, 21 June 2011
 'Facing the music: Nicholas Collon'.  The Guardian, 6 July 2015
 Residentie Orkest, English-language page on Nicholas Collon
 CD booklet Rutter: Requiem, lines on 'Nicholas Collon, organist', Naxos Records, 2003
 Nicholas Collon discography at Naxos Records

1983 births
Musicians from London
Living people
People educated at Eton College
Alumni of Clare College, Cambridge
British male conductors (music)
21st-century British conductors (music)
21st-century British male musicians